Boyfriend Material is a 2020 contemporary romance novel by Alexis Hall. Hall has stated that the novel was directly inspired by the Richard Curtis rom-coms of the 1990s and early 2000s, such as Notting Hill, Four Weddings and a Funeral, and Love Actually. 

Entertainment Weekly, Business Insider, and Bustle all named Boyfriend Material one of the Best Romance Novels of 2020. The novel was nominated for the Goodreads Choice Award for Best Romance, coming in fifth place.

A Publishers Weekly review called it "a triumph" and said that "Hall breathes new life into the fake dating trope with this effervescent queer rom-com."

The novel's sequel, titled Husband Material, was released in August of 2022. An untitled third novel following different characters from the same story will complete the trilogy.

References 

Contemporary romance novels
British romance novels
2020s LGBT novels
Gay male romance novels